The 1999–2000 season was the first time SSV Ulm 1846 played in the 1. Bundesliga, the highest tier of the German football league system. After 34 league games, SSV Ulm finished in 16th place, and were relegated back to the 2. Fußball-Bundesliga. The club reached the fourth round of the DFB-Pokal; losing 2–1 away to Werder Bremen. Hans van de Haar was the club's top goal scorer, with 12 goals in all competitions.

First team squad 
Squad at end of season

Competitions

Bundesliga

League table

Results

DFB-Pokal

References

External links 
 1999–2000 SSV Ulm 1846 season – squad and statistics at fussballdaten.de 

SSV Ulm 1846 seasons
Ulm